Wickenby Aerodrome  is an airport  nautical miles north-east of Lincoln, Lincolnshire, England.

Wickenby Aerodrome has a CAA Ordinary Licence (Number P882) that allows flights for the public transport of passengers or for flying instruction as authorised by the licensee (Wickenby Aerodrome LLP). The aerodrome is not licensed for night use.

Companies based at the airfield include: Thruster Aircraft, makers of microlights; Fly365 Ltd, which offers pleasure flights; and hauliers Rase Distribution. Pilots approaching the airfield have to initially contact the control tower at RAF Waddington. The local company Game Composites Limited uses this aerodrome for flight testing and development. Their aerobatic monoplane undertook its first flight from Wickenby during 2015.

References

External links
 Wickenby Aerodrome
 UKGA

Airports in England
Airports in Lincolnshire